Rosemary Nauwat (born 14 November 1968) is a Ugandan educator and legislator. As of April 2020, she is currently serving as the elected woman representative for Amudat District in Uganda's tenth parliament. She represented the same constituency in Uganda's ninth parliament as a member of the National Resistance Movement. She then contested the 2016 general elections as an independent candidate.

Background and education 
Nauwat did her Primary Leaving Examinations at Kalas Girls Primary in 1980 before achieving her O Levels (Uganda Certificate of Education) at Kangole Girls Secondary School in 1984. She later attended Kyebambe Girls Secondary School for her A Levels (Uganda Advanced Certificate of Education) in 1998 and then enrolled at Kaliro National Teachers College for a diploma in Secondary education obtained in 1993. Subsequently, she attained a Bachelor of Arts degree in Education from Makerere University in 2001.

Career 
Between 1994 and 2003, Nauwat worked as a teacher at Moroto High School.

She then contested for the seat of Women's Representative for Amudat District in 2011 on the National Resistance Movement ticket. She stood as an independent candidate in the 2016 General elections to retain the seat. As a female legislator in the tenth parliament of Uganda, she is a member of the Uganda Women Parliamentary Association (UWOPA) and sits on the parliamentary committee for the national economy.

See also 

 Amudat District
 Tenth Parliament of Uganda

References

External links 
Parliament of Uganda website

Living people
1968 births
Members of the Parliament of Uganda
Women members of the Parliament of Uganda
21st-century Ugandan politicians
21st-century Ugandan women politicians